The Vomit Gore Trilogy is a feature film trilogy of three American-Canadian surreal psychological horror films written and directed by Lucifer Valentine and produced by No Body. Valentine coined "vomit gore" as a new subgenre to describe the trilogy, which follows a nonlinear narrative that centres around teenage runaway Angela Aberdeen, a stripper that suffers from bulimia. The trilogy focuses primarily on situations involving vomiting, cannibalism, graphic sexual violence, gore, torture, and murder.

All three of the films received limited theatrical releases, and were released on DVD by distributor Unearthed Films. The trilogy was mostly panned by critics, who criticised its obscenity and depictions of violence against women.

Films

Slaughtered Vomit Dolls (2006) 

In order to make ends meet, Angela Aberdeen begins working as a prostitute. As her bulimia worsens, she begins to experience a series of hallucinations where she experiences visions of the deaths of her fellow strippers as well as various others. The film had a simultaneous DVD and limited theatrical release on 14 February 2006.

ReGOREgitated Sacrifice (2008) 
Angela, now in hell, encounters two twin succubi who sexually and violently torture and abuse her. The film had a simultaneous DVD and limited theatrical release on 13 June 2008.

Slow Torture Puke Chamber (2010) 
Final film in the trilogy, released in 2010.

See also 
Emetophilia

References

External links 
 
 
 

Trilogies
Film series introduced in 2006
BDSM in films
Obscenity controversies in film
Films about cannibalism